Azrack-Yassine Mahamat (born 24 March 1988) is a professional footballer who plays as a defensive midfielder for US Lusitanos Saint-Maur. Born in France, he represents the Chad national team internationally.

Club career
Mahamat was born in Créteil, France. He started his career at the AJ Auxerre youth academy and, on 18 June 2009, after two years appearing solely for the reserves, he left and signed with RCD Espanyol in Spain, being immediately assigned to the B-team.

In late July 2009, following a cooperation agreement between the Catalans and Halmstads BK, Mahamat moved to the Swedish club on loan. However, he returned in December, again joining the reserve side in Segunda División B; he made his first-team debut on 1 May 2010, coming on as a substitute for Iván Alonso and playing the entire second half in a 0–2  La Liga home loss against Valencia CF. Mahamat played in the top flight of Bulgarian football between 2012 and 2014.

International career
Mahamat made his debut for Chad on 6 September 2008, against Sudan. So far, he has 21 caps for the national team.

See also
List of Chad international footballers

References

External links

1988 births
Living people
French sportspeople of Chadian descent
Sportspeople from Créteil
Chadian footballers
French footballers
Footballers from Val-de-Marne
Association football midfielders
Chad international footballers
Championnat National 2 players
La Liga players
Segunda División B players
Allsvenskan players
Super League Greece players
Football League (Greece) players
First Professional Football League (Bulgaria) players
Indian Super League players
AJ Auxerre players
RCD Espanyol B footballers
RCD Espanyol footballers
Halmstads BK players
UD Melilla footballers
FC Etar 1924 Veliko Tarnovo players
FC Lokomotiv 1929 Sofia players
Platanias F.C. players
Levadiakos F.C. players
Kerala Blasters FC players
Trikala F.C. players
AS Poissy players
FC Blue Boys Muhlenbach players
US Lusitanos Saint-Maur players
Chadian expatriate footballers
French expatriate sportspeople in Spain
Expatriate footballers in France
Chadian expatriate sportspeople in Spain
Expatriate footballers in Spain
Chadian expatriate sportspeople in Sweden
Expatriate footballers in Sweden
Chadian expatriate sportspeople in Bulgaria
Expatriate footballers in Bulgaria
Chadian expatriate sportspeople in Greece
Expatriate footballers in Greece
Chadian expatriate sportspeople in India
Expatriate footballers in India
Chadian expatriate sportspeople in Luxembourg
Expatriate footballers in Luxembourg
Black French sportspeople